General elections were held in Nicaragua on 25 February 1990 to elect the President and the members of the National Assembly. The result was a victory for the National Opposition Union (UNO), whose presidential candidate Violeta Chamorro surprisingly defeated incumbent president Daniel Ortega of the Sandinista National Liberation Front (FSLN). This led to a historic peaceful and democratic transfer of power in Nicaragua.

Background
Ortega had held power since the FSLN toppled the Somoza dictatorship in 1979. Chamorro was the editor of the country’s largest newspaper, La Prensa, which she took over after the assassination of her husband Pedro Joaquín Chamorro Cardenal in 1978. A vocal critic of the dictatorship, his murder galvanized support for the Sandinistas against the dictatorship. Following the revolution that overthrew Somoza, Violeta Chamorro initially supported the FSLN government, accepting an invitation to join the Junta of National Reconstruction. However she soon became disenchanted and resigned, returning to the newspaper and becoming a critic of the FSLN government. In 1989 the United States Congress approved $9 million for the promotion of democracy in Nicaragua, of which $2.5 million was set aside for the UNO, in addition to a $5 million grant for the opposition earlier that year. Beginning in early 1989 the government held a series of talks with the opposition about reforming electoral and media laws. In April 1989 the Electoral Law was reformed, giving the opposition a larger share of public campaign funds, increased access to state run media and permission to receive foreign financing.

Campaign

With a diverse coalition of 14 opposition groups, the UNO mainly campaigned on a promise to end the decades of civil war and instability that wracked the country.

While the FSLN was mainly under controversy for their campaign due to their use of violence.

Opinion polls
Opinion polls leading up to the elections divided along partisan lines, with 10 of 17 polls analyzed in a contemporary study predicting an UNO victory while 7 predicted the Sandinistas would retain power.

Results
The election was organized by Mariano Fiallos Oyanguren, a law professor and Sandinista who was appointed by the FSLN in 1984 to head the Supreme Electoral Council. He faced party pressure to throw the race, specifically to announce at 19:00 on election night that the results of the first four precincts were four victories for the FSLN. Instead he chose to read the real results, which split the precincts, with two going to the FSLN and two to the ONU, which went on to win the election. Chamorro was elected with just under 55% of the vote.

Antonio Lacayo, a Sandinista supporter who voted for Ortega but ultimately served as a central figure in the Violeta Chamorro administration, said later: “Without Mariano Fiallos [Oyanguren] there would have been no democratic transition in 1990.”

President

National Assembly

By region

Analysis
Possible explanations for the ONU victory include that the Nicaraguan people were disenchanted with the Ortega government, specifically discontentment with the management of the economy and the hostile posture toward the United States, believing the ONU was more likely to bring peace. Additionally, in November 1989, the White House had met with Chamorro on the subject of peace and democracy in Nicaragua and announced that the economic embargo against Nicaragua would end if Chamorro won. There are also reports of intimidation from the side of the Contras, with a Canadian observer mission claiming that 42 people were killed by the Contras in "election violence" in October 1989.

References

Nicaragua
Nicaraguan Revolution
Elections in Nicaragua
Nicaragua
General
Presidential elections in Nicaragua